This is a list of residential colleges at various college campuses. It gives the name of the university and country in which each college is located. It is sorted by country (and sometimes by regional subdivision), and in alphabetical order by university name and then college name within each country.

Australia

South Australia

Residential Colleges in North Adelaide
Independent colleges associated with the University of Adelaide, University of South Australia and Flinders University.
 Aquinas College
 Kathleen Lumley College (postgraduate)
 Lincoln College
 St. Ann's College
 St. Mark's College

Flinders University
 University Hall

Australian Capital Territory

Australian National University

 Bruce Hall
 Burgmann College
 Burton & Garran Hall
 Fenner Hall
 Graduate House
 John XXIII College
 Toad Hall
 Ursula Hall
 University House
 Yukeembruk College

Tasmania

University of Tasmania
 Christ College
 Jane Franklin Hall
 Kerslake Hall, Launceston
 St. John Fisher College

Victoria

La Trobe University
 Chisholm College
 Glenn College
 Menzies College

University of Melbourne
 Graduate House
 International House
 Janet Clarke Hall
 Medley Hall
 Newman College
 Ormond College
 Queen's College
 St. Hilda's College
 St. Mary's College
 Trinity College
 University College
 Whitley College

Monash University
 Mannix College

New South Wales

Macquarie University
 Dunmore Lang College
 Robert Menzies College

University of New England
 Austin College, University of New England
 Drummond and Smith College
 Duval College
 Earle Page College
 Mary White College
 Robb College
 St Albert's College

University of New South Wales
 Basser College
 Colombo House
 Creston College
 Fig Tree Hall
 Goldstein College
 International House
 New College
 Philip Baxter College
 Shalom College
 UNSW Hall
 Warrane College

University of Sydney
International House
Mandelbaum House
 Sancta Sophia College
 St. Andrew's College
 St. John's College
 St. Paul's College
 Wesley College
 The Women's College

University of Wollongong
 Campus East
 Graduate House
 Gundi
 International House
 Kooloobong
 Keiraview
 The Manor
 Marketview
 Weerona College

Queensland

Independent
 Raymont Residential College

Griffith University
 Bellenden Ker College
 Griffith University Village
 KGBC
 Mt. Gravatt College

James Cook University
 Saints Catholic College
 Saint Mark's College (James Cook University)|Saint Mark's College
 The John Flynn College

University of Queensland
 Cromwell College
 Duschesne College
 Emmanuel College
 Grace College
 International House
 King's College
 St. John's College
 St. Leo's College
 Union College
 Women's College

Western Australia

Curtin University
 St. Catherine's College

University of Western Australia
 St. Catherine's College
 St. George's College
 St. Thomas Moore College
 Trinity College
 University Hall

Canada

University of British Columbia 
 Green College
 St. John's College

Trent University 
 Catharine Parr Traill College
 Champlain College
 Julian Blackburn College
 Lady Eaton College
 Otonabee College
 Peter Gzowski College

University of Manitoba 
 St. Andrew's College
 St. John's College
 St. Paul's College
 University College
 Université de Saint-Boniface

University of Waterloo 
 Conrad Grebel University College
 Renison University College
 St. Jerome's University
 St. Paul's University College

University of Western Ontario 
 Brescia University College
 Huron University College
 King's University College

University of Toronto
Constituent colleges
 Innis College
 New College
 University College
 Woodsworth College

 Federated colleges
 St. Michael's College
 Loretto College
 Trinity College
 St. Hilda's College
 Victoria University
 Emmanuel College

 Theological colleges
 Knox College
 Regis College
 Wycliffe College
 Massey College, affiliated but independent

York University

 Calumet College
 Founders College
 Glendon College
 McLaughlin College
 New College
 Norman Bethune College
 Stong College
 Vanier College
 Winters College

Germany

Jacobs University Bremen
 Alfried Krupp College
 College Nordmetall
 College 3
 Mercator College

Hong Kong

Chinese University of Hong Kong
 Chung Chi College
 New Asia College
 United College
 Shaw College
 Morningside College
 S. H. Ho College
 Lee Woo Sing College
 Wu Yee Sun College 
 C. W. Chu College

South Korea

POSTECH
 RC 21동

Yonsei University
Sinchon and International Campus:
 한결 하우스 (Evergreen House)
 이원철 하우스 (Wonchul House)
 언더우드 하우스 (Underwood House)
 윤동주 하우스 (Yun, Dong-Joo House)
 무악 하우스 (Muak House)
 치원 하우스 (Chi Won House)
 용재 하우스 (Yongjae House)
 에비슨 하우스 (Avison House) 
 백양 하우스 (Baek Yang House)
 청송하우스 (Cheongsong House)
 알렌 국제 하우스 (Allen International House)
 아리스토텔레스 국제 하우스 (Aristotle International House)

Wonju Campus:
 이글 하우스 (Eagle House)
 솜니움 하우스 (Somnium House)
 머레이 하우스 (Murray House)
 로이스 하우스 (Lois House)
 베리타스 하우스 (Veritas House)
 아람뜰 하우스 (Aramttle House)
 초아름 하우스 (Choareum House)

Handong Global University
 토레이칼리지 (Torrey College, 비전관)
 카이퍼칼리지 (Kuyper College, 창조관)
 손양원칼리지 (Son Yang Won College, 벧엘관)
 열송학사칼리지 (Philadelphos College, 로뎀관)
 장기려칼리지 (Chang Kee ryo College, 은혜관)
 카마이클칼리지 (Carmichael College, 국제관)

India

Kerala

University of Calicut
 Sree Kerala Varma College, Thrissur
 St. Thomas College, Thrissur
 Sree Narayana College, Nattika
 Sree Narayana Guru College of Advanced Studies, Nattika
 St. Aloysius College, Elthuruth
 Vimala College, Thrissur
 St. Marys College, Thrissur
 Little Flower College, Guruvayoor
 Sree Krishna College, Guruvayoor
 MES, Asmabi, Kodungaloor
 Sahrdaya College of Advanced Studies, Kodakara
 Prajyoti Niketan College, Pudukad
 St. Thomas College, Thrissur
 Panampilly Memorial College, Chalakudy
 IHRD, Nattika
 Christ College, Irinjalakuda
 C. K. Achuthamenon College, Kuttanellur
 Government College, Ollur

Mahathma Gandhi University
 St. Thomas College, Kozhencheri
 Union Christian College, Aluva
 Maharaja's College, Ernakulam
 SNM College, Maliankara, Moothakunnam
 KMM College of Arts and Science, Thrikkakara
 Nirmala College, Muvattupuzha
 Newman College, Thodupuzha

Italy

University of Pavia

The University of Pavia has 16 residential colleges, with the oldest dating back to the 16th century. Eleven are state-owned, four are independent colleges "legally recognised by the Italian Ministry of University and Research" and one is private. Students are not required to be members of a college.

 Collegio Alessandro Volta 
 Collegio Benvenuto Griziotti 
 Collegio Borromeo (independent)
 Collegio Castiglioni-Brugnatelli
 Collegio Fratelli Cairoli 
 Collegio Gerolamo Cardano 
 Collegio Ghislieri (independent)
 Collegio Giasone del Maino
 Collegio Lazzaro Spallanzani 
 Collegio Lorenzo Valla  
 Collegio Nuovo (independent)
 Collegio Plinio Fraccaro 
 Collegio Santa Caterina da Siena (independent)
 Collegio Universitario Quartier Novo 
 Residenze Golgi I e II
 Private Residence "Campus 4 us"

New Zealand

Auckland University
 International House
 Grafton Hall
 O'Rorke Hall

University of Otago

The University of Otago has 15 colleges, of which 10 are undergraduate only, 4 take both postgraduates and undergraduates, and one is postgraduate only.

 Abbey College (postgraduate only)
 Aquinas College
 Arana College (undergraduate and postgraduate)
 Caroline Freeman College (undergraduate and postgraduate)
 Carrington College
 Cumberland College
 Hayward College
 Knox College (undergraduate and postgraduate)
 St Margaret's College
 Salmond College (undergraduate and postgraduate)
 Selwyn College
 Studholme College
 Te Rangi Hiroa College
 Toroa College
 University College

Singapore

National University of Singapore
 Cinnamon College
 College of Alice and Peter Tan
 Ridge View Residential College
 Residential College 4
 Tembusu College

Yale-NUS College
 Saga College
 Elm College
 Cendana College

Thailand

King Mongkut's University of Technology Thonburi
 Residential College at KMUTT Ratchaburi Learning Park

United Kingdom

University of Cambridge

 Christ's College
 Churchill College
 Clare College
 Clare Hall (postgraduate only)
 Corpus Christi College
 Darwin College (postgraduate only)
 Downing College
 Emmanuel College
 Fitzwilliam College
 Girton College
 Gonville and Caius College
 Homerton College
 Hughes Hall (mature and postgraduate students only)
 Jesus College
 King's College
 Lucy Cavendish College (women only; mature and postgraduate students only)
 Magdalene College
 Murray Edwards College (women only)
 Newnham College (women only)
 Pembroke College
 Peterhouse
 Queens' College
 Robinson College
 St Catharine's College
 St Edmund's College (mature and postgraduate students only)
 St John's College
 Selwyn College
 Sidney Sussex College
 Trinity College
 Trinity Hall
 Wolfson College (mature and postgraduate students only)
Source:

Durham University

 Collingwood College
 Grey College
 Hatfield College
 John Snow College
 Josephine Butler College
 St Aidan's College
 St Chad's College
 St Cuthbert's Society
 College of St Hild and St Bede
 St John's College
 St Mary's College
 South College 
 Stephenson College
 Trevelyan College
 University College 

 Ustinov College (postgraduate only)
 Van Mildert College

Source:

University of Kent

The University of Kent has seven colleges in its Canterbury campus (one primarily postgraduate) and one (for both undergraduates and postgraduates) at its Medway campus.
 Darwin College 
 Eliot College 
 Keynes College 
 Medway College (undergraduate and postgraduate; at Medway campus)
 Park Wood College
 Rutherford College 
 Turing College 
 Woolf College (mainly postgraduate)

Lancaster University

 Bowland College
 Cartmel College
 The County College
 Furness College
 Fylde College
 Graduate College (postgraduate only)
 Grizedale College
 Lonsdale College
 Pendle College

Source:

University of Oxford

 All Souls College (does not accept postgraduate or undergraduate students)
 Balliol College
 Blackfriars Hall
 Brasenose College
 Campion Hall (postgraduate only)
 Christ Church
 Corpus Christi College
 Exeter College
 Green Templeton College (postgraduate only)
 Harris Manchester College
 Hertford College
 Jesus College
 Keble College, Oxford
 Kellogg College (postgraduate only)
 Lady Margaret Hall
 Linacre College (postgraduate only)
 Lincoln College
 Magdalen College
 Mansfield College
 Merton College
 New College
 Nuffield College (postgraduate only)
 Oriel College
 Pembroke College
 The Queen's College
 Regent's Park College
 Reuben College (postgraduate only)
 St Anne's College
 St Antony's College (postgraduate only)
 St Benet's Hall
 St Catherine's College
 St Cross College (postgraduate only)
 St Edmund Hall
 St Hilda's College
 St Hugh's College
 St John's College
 St Peter's College
 St Stephen's House
 Somerville College
 Trinity College
 University College
 Wadham College
 Wolfson College (postgraduate only)
 Worcester College
 Wycliffe Hall

Source:

University of Roehampton
 Digby Stuart College
 Froebel College
 Southlands College
 Whitelands College

Source:

University of York

 Alcuin College
 Anne Lister College
 Constantine College
 David Kato College
 Derwent College
 Goodricke College
 Halifax College
 James College
 Langwith College
 Vanbrugh College
 Wentworth Graduate College (postgraduate only)

Source:

United States

Northeast

Binghamton University
Binghamton University has six residential communities:
 Apartment Community
 College-In-The-Woods
 Dickinson Community
 Hinman College
 Mountainview College
 Newing College

Cornell University
Cornell has a variety of housing options, including residences halls, program houses (themed residences halls) and co-op houses. Two of the program houses are identified as residential colleges:

 Risley Residential College
 Ujamaa Residential College

The houses of the West Campus House System have also been identified by the university as a "residential college initiative":

 Carl Becker House
 Hans Bethe House
 Alice Cook House
 William Keeton House
 Flora Rose House

Dartmouth College

Dartmouth has six houses in its house system and all students are members of a house:

 Allen House
 East Wheelock House
 North Park House
 School House
 South House
 West House

Fairfield University
Fairfield University has three sophomore residential colleges that offer both residence and academic programmes to sophomore (second year) students:
 Service for Justice Residential College
 Ignatian Leadership Residential College
 Creative Life Residential College

Fordham University
Fordham University has three integrated learning communities for first year students and six for upperclassmen.

First year integrated learning communities:
 Loyola Residential College and the Manresa Program
 Queen’s Court Residential College
 Science Integrated Learning Community

Upperclassmen integrated learning communities:

 Campbell and Salice-Conley Residential College
 Integrated Learning Community for Global Business
 The West Wing: Integrated Learning Community for Ignatian Leadership and Civic Service
 The Wellness Integrated Learning Community
 Upperclass Science Integrated Learning Community
 Tierney Sophomore Year Experience

Franklin & Marshall College
Franklin & Marshall has five college houses:
 Bonchek College House
 Brooks College House
 Roschel College House
 Ware College House
 Weis College House

Harvard University

Harvard's house system covers upper-level students (beyond the first year). There are twelve residential houses and one "community" for non-residential students:
 Adams House
 Cabot House
 Currier House
 Dudley Community
 Dunster House
 Eliot House
 Kirkland House
 Leverett House
 Lowell House
 Mather House
 Pforzheimer House
 Quincy House
 Winthrop House

Princeton University

Princeton has six undergraduate colleges and one graduate college:
 Butler College
 First College
 Forbes College
 Graduate College (graduate students)
 Mathey College 
 Rockefeller College
 Whitman College

Rochester Institute of Technology
Rochester Institute of Technology has seven special interest houses:
 Art House
 Computer Science House (CSH)
 Engineering House
 House of General Science (HoGS)
 International House (I-House)
 Photo House
 Unity House

Rutgers, The State University of New Jersey
 Douglass Residential College (women only)

Yale University

Yale has 14 residential colleges and all undergraduates belong to a college.
 Benjamin Franklin College
 Berkeley College
 Branford College
 Davenport College
 Ezra Stiles College
 Grace Hopper College
 Jonathan Edwards College
 Morse College
 Pauli Murray College
 Pierson College
 Saybrook College
 Silliman College
 Timothy Dwight College
 Trumbull College

Midwest

Central Michigan University
Central Michigan University has ten themed "living learning communities":
 Business Residential College
 Education and Human Services Residential College
 Health Professions Residential College 
 Honors Program Residential Community 
 Leader Advancement Scholars
 Multicultural Advancement and Lloyd Cofer Scholars Residential College
 Public-Spirited Scholars 
 School of Music Residential College
 Science and Engineering Residential College 
 Transfer Student Community

University of Michigan, Ann Arbor
 Residential College

Michigan State University
Michigan State University has three themed residential colleges.
 James Madison College (public affairs and public policy)
 Lyman Briggs College (interdisciplinary studies and sciences
 Residential College in the Arts and Humanities (arts and humanities)

Northwestern University

Northwestern has ten themed undergraduate residential colleges:
 Residential College of Commerce and Industry 
 Humanities Residential College
 Residential College of Cultural and Community Studies 
 Communications Residential College
 Women's Residential College
 Public Affairs Residential College
 Shepard Residential College
 Residential College of Science and Engineering
 International Studies Residential College
 Willard Residential College

Washington University in St. Louis
Washington University in St. Louis has ten residential colleges for first and second year students:
 Hitzeman, Hurd and Myers 
 Lee and Beaumont
 Liggett and Koenig
 Park and Mudd
 Robert S. Brookings
 Shanedling, Dauten and Rutledge
 Thomas H. Eliot
 Umrath and South 40
 Wayman Crow
 William Greenleaf Eliot
University of Notre Dame

South

Appalachian State University 
 Watauga Residential College

Baylor University
 Brooks Residential College

Emory University
 Oxford College

University of Georgia
 Franklin Residential College

Louisiana State University
 Broussard I.T. Residential College
 Herget Freshman Residential College

Murray State University

 Clark College
 Elizabeth College
 Hart College
 Hester College
 Regents College
 Richmond College
 Springer-Franklin College
 White College

University of Miami 
 Eaton Residential College
 Hecht Residential College
 Mahoney Residential College
 Pearson Residential College
 Stanford Residential College

University of Mississippi
 Residential College

University of North Carolina at Greensboro 
 Ashby Residential College at Mary Foust Hall
 Cornelia Strong College
 Grogan College
 Warren Ashby Residential College at Mary Foust Hall

University of Oklahoma 
 Dunham College
 Headington College

University of South Carolina
 Preston Residential College

Southern Arkansas University
 Residential College at East Hall

Tulane University
 Wall Residential College

University of Virginia 
 Brown College at Monroe Hill
 Hereford College
 International Residential College

Vanderbilt University 
Vanderbilt University has ten first-year houses, located on The Martha Rivers Ingram Commons, and five upper-division residential colleges.
The Martha Rivers Ingram Commons
Crawford House
East House
Gillette House
Hank Ingram House
Memorial House
Murray House
North House
Stambaugh House
Sutherland House
West House
 Warren College
 Moore College
 E. Bronson Ingram College (E.B.I.)
Nicholas S. Zeppos College (Zeppos)
Rothschild College

Virginia Tech 
 Residential College at West Ambler Johnston
 Honors Residential College
 Leadership and Social Change College

Rice University 

 Baker College
 Brown College
 Duncan College
 Hanszen College
 Jones College
 Lovett College
 Martel College
 McMurtry College
 Sid Richardson College
 Wiess College
 Will Rice College

University of Central Arkansas 

The University of Central Arkansas has six residential colleges: five "living and learning communities" and one "commuter learning community".

 HPaW Residential College in Baridon Hall
 EDGE Residential College in Hughes Hall
 The Stars Residential College in Short/Denney Hall
 STEM Residential College in Arkansas Hall
 Business Residential College in Bear Hall
 Minton Commuter College in Old Main Hall

West

University of California, San Diego

 Earl Warren College
 Eleanor Roosevelt College
 John Muir College
 Revelle College
 Seventh College
 Sixth College
 Thurgood Marshall College

University of California, Santa Cruz

 College Nine
 College Ten
 Cowell College
 Crown College
 Kresge College
 Merrill College
 Oakes College
 Porter College
Rachel Carson College
 Stevenson College

University of California, Berkeley
 Bowles Hall

Stanford University
 Freshman-Sophomore College

External links
 collegiateway.org's list of residential colleges

References

Residential
+